According to the Book of Mormon, Zenos was an old world prophet whose pre-Christian era writings were recorded upon the plates of brass. Zenos is quoted or paraphrased a number of times by writers in the Book of Mormon, including Nephi, Jacob, Alma, son of Alma, Nephi, son of Helaman, Samuel the Lamanite, and Mormon.

Zenos is reported to have written on a variety of topics, including the signs to accompany the death of the Messiah, the Atonement of Christ, and the scattering and gathering of Israel. According to one Book of Mormon writer, Zenos was killed as a result of his preaching.

Dead Sea Scrolls connection

Outside of the Book of Mormon, there is no direct evidence that Zenos existed. However, Some LDS scholars argue that Zenos' Book of Mormon hymn of thanksgiving and praise, which elaborates upon prayer, worship, and mercy, compares favorably in style and content with Hymn H (or 8) and Hymn J (or 10) of the Thanksgiving Hymns of the Dead Sea Scrolls. 

Additionally, there is evidence that writings of, and references to several ancient Israelite prophets were destroyed by the ruling class of the ancient Jews.  The best known example of this is a reference in the Dead Sea Scrolls to an ancient prophet known as the Teacher of Righteousness who was driven out of Jewish society because he preached of the coming of a Messiah. Outside of the Dead Sea Scrolls, there is no other reference to this person, and until 1950, there was absolutely no record of his existence. However, certain identical components exist between allegories found within the Book of Mormon and those contributions found in the Dead Sea Scrolls.

The scrolls state that the Teacher of Righteousness was descended from Zadok, which some LDS scholars have argued might have been a transcribed or altered version of the name Zenock, another prophet referenced only in the Book of Mormon. Non-LDS scholars identify this Zadok as the priest who anointed Solomon (1 Kings 1:39, 2:35) and whose dynasty officiated in the office of High Priest around 1,000-700 BC. Thus, being descended from Zadok more likely meant that the Teacher was a member of, loyal to, or teacher of doctrines espoused by this Zadok.

See also
Neum (prophet)
Sons of Zadok
Zenock

References

Book of Mormon prophets